This is a list of episodes for the Brazilian HBO original series Mandrake.

As of December 16, 2007, 13 episodes have aired over 2 seasons.

Season 1 (2005)

Season 2 (2007)

Brazilian television series
Lists of crime television series episodes